Inozemsky Prikaz (lit. Office for the Affairs of the Foreigners) was a central government agency in the 17th-century Russia, which dealt with the affairs of the foreigners, including those hired by the Russian military. This prikaz was established around 1624 and then merged with the Reiter Prikaz in 1680. Inozemsky Prikaz also governed the affairs of the German Quarter until 1666. In 1701, its functions were transferred under the authority of the Military Affairs Prikaz.

See also
Regiments of the new order

17th century in Russia
1624 establishments in Russia
1701 disestablishments in Russia